Pyotr Kovalenko (10 October 1942 – 1993) was a Soviet ski jumper. He competed in the normal hill and large hill events at the 1964 Winter Olympics.

References

External links
 

1942 births
1993 deaths
Soviet male ski jumpers
Olympic ski jumpers of the Soviet Union
Ski jumpers at the 1964 Winter Olympics
People from Sortavala
Sportspeople from the Republic of Karelia